cksum is a command in Unix and Unix-like operating systems that generates a checksum value for a file or stream of data. The cksum command reads each file given in its arguments, or standard input if no arguments are provided, and outputs the file's 32-bit cyclic redundancy check (CRC) checksum and byte count. The CRC output by cksum is different from the CRC-32 used in zip, PNG and zlib.

The cksum command can be used to verify that files transferred by unreliable means arrived intact. However, the CRC checksum calculated by the cksum command is not cryptographically secure: While it guards against accidental corruption (it is unlikely that the corrupted data will have the same checksum as the intended data), it is not difficult for an attacker to deliberately corrupt the file in a specific way that its checksum is unchanged. Unix-like systems typically include other commands for cryptographically secure checksums, such as sha256sum.

The command is available as a separate package for Microsoft Windows as part of the UnxUtils collection of native Win32 ports of common GNU Unix-like utilities.

Latest GNU Coreutils cksum provides additional checksum algorithms via -a option, as an extension beyond POSIX.

Interoperability
The standard cksum command, as found on most Unix and Unix-like operating systems (including Linux, *BSD, macOS, and Solaris) uses a CRC algorithm based on the ethernet standard frame check and is therefore interoperable between implementations. This is in contrast to the sum command, which is not as interoperable and not compatible with the CRC-32 calculation. On Tru64 operating systems, the cksum command returns a different CRC value, unless the environment variable CMD_ENV is set to xpg4.

Algorithm
cksum uses the generator polynomial 0x04C11DB7 and appends to the message its length in little endian representation. That length has null bytes trimmed on the right end.

Syntax
cksum [FILE]...
cksum [OPTION]

Usage example
$ cksum test.txt
4038471504 75 test.txt

where 4038471504 represents the checksum value and 75 represents the file size of test.txt.

See also
 Cyclic redundancy check
 GNU Core Utilities
 sum
 md5sum

References

External links

 
 cksum – GNU Core Utilities
 
 

Checksum algorithms
Standard Unix programs
Unix SUS2008 utilities